The canton of Royan is an administrative division of the Charente-Maritime department, western France. It was created at the French canton reorganisation which came into effect in March 2015. Its seat is in Royan.

It consists of the following communes:
Royan
Saint-Georges-de-Didonne
Vaux-sur-Mer

References

Cantons of Charente-Maritime